Ned is an unincorporated community in Breathitt County, Kentucky. Ned had a post office until it closed on August 24, 1986.

References

Unincorporated communities in Breathitt County, Kentucky
Unincorporated communities in Kentucky